Joseph Pilato (March 16, 1949 – March 24, 2019) was an American film and voice actor. He was perhaps best known for his performance as Captain Rhodes in the 1985 film Day of the Dead.

Early life
He was born in Fitchburg in 1949 to an Italian-American family. His father was a professional trombonist with the Les Brown Orchestra. Joseph was enrolled into Catholic school and became an altar boy, where his talent for acting was developed.

Career

Day of the Dead and success
In 1984, six years after the release of Dawn of the Dead, director George A. Romero was planning a new zombie film called Day of the Dead. Pilato had appeared as a cameo in Dawn of the Dead as a police officer, which had been his first feature film role. Pilato was selected to play United States Army Captain Rhodes. He is best known for this performance, and the film, along with its predecessors, have become classics.

Later career and other projects
Pilato later voiced Vexor in Big Bad Beetleborgs under the alias of "Joey Pal" and worked in the English dub of Digimon Adventure and Digimon Adventure 02 voicing MetalGreymon. He would later land minor roles in such films as Wishmaster, Pulp Fiction, Digimon: The Movie, and Night of the Living Dead: Origins 3D.

Death
Joe Pilato died in his sleep on March 24, 2019, eight days after his 70th birthday.

Personal life
Joe Pilato had one daughter, Gianna Pilato, who was born in 1994.

Filmography

Television and film

Video games

References

External links

1949 births
2019 deaths
American male film actors
American male voice actors
American people of Italian descent
Male actors from Boston
20th-century American male actors
21st-century American male actors